William Crichton, 1st Earl of Dumfries the ninth Lord Crichton,  was born to William Crichton (brother of the sixth and seventh Lords Crichton) and Katherine Carmichael.

The title Lord Crichton passed to William after his cousin Robert was hanged outside Westminster Hall for his involvement with a murder. A challenge arose to his claim to the title and lands from an illegitimate son of Robert, but a decree arbitral from King James VI found in favour of William's rights to the title, and compensated Robert's son with lands around Perth.

On 31 July 1617, King James VI stayed at Sanquhar Castle while travelling through Scotland. During this visit, Crichton is reported to have burnt a bond recording a large debt owed to him the King. In 1622, the King gave Crichton the title Viscount of Ayr. Eleven years later, King Charles I of England gave Crichton the title Earl of Dumfries and Baron Crichton of Cumnock. Then in 1635, Crichton was given Lefnoreis Castle and surrounding lands (on which a descendant would later build Dumfries House).

By the time of his death in 1642 or 1643, due to the family's financial difficulties William and his sons had sold Sanquhar Castle and the estates in the area to William Douglas, 1st Earl of Queensberry, and relocated the family to Cumnock.

Family 

He first married Euphemia Seton, daughter of Sir James Seton of Touch and widow of Patrick Hamilton, and they produced five children.
 William, the second Earl of Dumfries
 James, who served for a time as Sheriff of Dumfries
 John, who served as a colonel in the Thirty Years' War.
 Mary, who married Edward Barnham Swift Viscount Carlingford
 Catherine, who married Sir John Charteris of Amsfield a Commissioner of the Scottish Parliament

He then married Ursula Barnham, daughter of Stephen Barnham and widow of Sir Robert Swift High Sheriff of Yorkshire. She and William produced no children.

References 

|-

|-

Earls of Dumfries
17th-century Scottish peers
Members of the Convention of the Estates of Scotland 1630